The Flowering Cherry is a 1958 play written by Robert Bolt.

The play was performed on Broadway in 1959.

Plot
In an English household, the father dreams of giving up his job selling insurance to run an apple orchard, the mother dreams of him giving up his dreams, and the two children have problems of their own .

Adaptations
The play was adapted for British television in 1963.

1963 Australian TV adaptation

It was filmed for Australian TV in 1963, directed by Colin Dean and starring Grant Taylor, Peter Adams, Don Pascoe, Elizabeth Ferris, Margo Lee, Frank Taylor and Rosalind Seagrave.

It was the first drama to be simultaneously presented in Sydney, Canberra and Melbourne via coaxial cable.

Plot
A man abandons his life as a clerk to start an orchard. His dreams of fulfilment are linked to his memories of growing up in Somerset.

His wife decides to leave him.

Cast
Grant Taylor as Mr Cherry
Margo Lee as Isobel Cherry, his wife
Rosalind Seagrave as Taylor's daughter Judy
Peter Adams as Taylor's son Tom
Frank Taylor
Elizabeth Ferris
Don Pascoe

Production
The production was filmed in Sydney.

At the time Grant Taylor was appearing on stage with Googie Withers in Woman in a Dressing Gown.

Elizabeth Ferris who made her acting debut was a diving champion whose name was linked romantically to Murray Rose.

Reception
The TV critic for the Sydney Morning Herald thought "Grant Taylor was well in command" of his role but that Colin Dean's production "was rather too crowded."

Val Marshall of the Sunday edition of the same paper called it "a first rate production" in which Taylor and Lee were "brilliant".

The Bulletin wrote that "Given a stronger plot, livelier dialogue,   less   stagey   sets,   more imaginative  cameras, some television   actors,   and  better   make-up,   it   could   have   been   a  good   play.   Lacking   them,   it   was   still tolerable,   because   the   viewer   could   feel  that   at   least   everyone   was   trying,   and that   is   not   a   bad   beginning   for   ABC  drama   production   in   1963."

See also
Robert Bolt#Plays for more information

References

External links
1963 Australian TV Play at National Film and Sound Archive

1958 plays
1963 television plays
British plays
West End plays
1960s Australian television plays